The 2014 Indian general election polls in Karnataka for 28 Lok Sabha seats was held in a single phase on 17 April 2014. As of 14 February 2014, the total voter strength of Karnataka is 44,694,658.

The main political parties are Bharatiya Janata Party, Indian National Congress and Janata Dal.

Opinion polling

Election schedule

Constituency wise Election schedule are given below –

Results
BJP won 17 seats. INC won 9 seats and JD (S) won 2 seats.

Source: http://eciresults.nic.in/PartyWiseResultS10.htm?st=S10

To Kannada site:ಕರ್ನಾಟಕ ಲೋಕಸಭಾ ಚುನಾವಣೆ, ೨೦೧೪ ಕರ್ನಾಟಕ ಲೋಕಸಭಾ ಚುನಾವಣೆ, ೨೦೧೪

Constituency Wise Results

Bye-election

References

Indian general elections in Karnataka
2010s in Karnataka
Karnataka